Lebiasina is a genus of fishes found in tropical South America, where they inhabit well-oxygenated upland streams that originate in the Andes of Colombia, Ecuador and Peru, the Guianan Highlands in Brazil, Guyana and Venezuela, and Serra do Cachimbo in Brazil. The individual species tend to have relatively small ranges and the three species of Serra do Cachimbo, all restricted to the Curuá River basin, are considered threatened by Brazil's Ministry of the Environment.

Species
There are eighteen currently recognized species:

 Lebiasina ardilai Netto-Ferreira, López-Fernández, Taphorn & Liverpool, 2013
 Lebiasina astrigata  (Regan, 1903) 
 Lebiasina bimaculata Valenciennes, 1847 (twospot lebiasina)
 Lebiasina chocoensis Ardila Rodríguez, 2010
 Lebiasina chucuriensis Ardila Rodríguez, 2001
 Lebiasina colombia Ardila Rodríguez, 2008
 Lebiasina floridablancaensis Ardila Rodríguez, 1994
 Lebiasina intermedia Meinken, 1936
 Lebiasina marilynae Netto-Ferreira, 2012
 Lebiasina melanoguttata Netto-Ferreira, 2012
 Lebiasina minuta Netto-Ferreira, 2012
 Lebiasina multimaculata Boulenger, 1911
 Lebiasina narinensis Ardila Rodríguez, 2002
 Lebiasina ortegai Ardila Rodríguez, 2008
 Lebiasina provenzanoi Ardila Rodríguez, 1999
 Lebiasina taphorni Ardila Rodríguez, 2004
 Lebiasina uruyensis Fernández-Yépez, 1967
 Lebiasina yepezi Netto-Ferreira, Oyakawa, Zuanon & Nolasco, 2011
 Lebiasina yuruaniensis Ardila Rodríguez, 2000

References

Lebiasinidae
Taxa named by Achille Valenciennes
Fish of South America